John McAreavey is an accountant and former Irish sportsperson. He played Gaelic football with his local club Tullylish and the Down senior inter-county team. His uncle is John McAreavey, former bishop of the Diocese of Dromore. The 2011 murder of his wife, Michaela McAreavey, while they were honeymooning in Mauritius, sent shockwaves through Ireland.

Playing career

Club
McAreavey was captain of his club Tullylish. In October 2010, he captained Tullylish to the Down Intermediate Football Championship beating neighbours and rivals Annaclone by a point in the final. McAreavey was named "man-of-the-match". He had also played a crucial role in the semi-final, scoring a late equaliser and then setting up the winner. Prior to this the club had not won anything since a junior title in 1968. The win meant promotion for Tullylish to the Down Senior Football Championship the following season.

Inter-county
McAreavey made his debut for Down in 2008. He scored 2-3 in his first senior appearance which came against Donegal in the Dr McKenna Cup. He made a substitute appearance in the All-Ireland Senior Football Championship 2008 quarter-final against Wexford at Croke Park. He was selected for the Down panel in 2011, months after his wife Michaela Harte, daughter of the then Tyrone county football team manager Mickey Harte, was murdered on their honeymoon in Mauritius. He met another woman on a “Saturday night, 10 November 2012” after attending a match in Michaela's memory in Galway. They became engaged in October 2015 and married in County Kildare in September 2016.

Honours
 Dr McKenna Cup (1) 2008
 Down Intermediate Football Championship (1) 2010 (c)
 Down Intermediate Football final Man of the Match (1) 2010
 Down ACFL Division 3 (1) 2009

References

Year of birth missing (living people)
Living people
Down inter-county Gaelic footballers
McAreavey
Tullylish Gaelic footballers